Paul "Rocky" Rochester (July 15, 1938 – June 7, 2020) was an American professional football player who was a defensive tackle in the American Football League (AFL). He played for the Dallas Texans/Kansas City Chiefs (1960–1963) and the New York Jets (1964–1969). He played college football at Michigan State University.

He was an AFL All-Star in 1961, and he earned an AFL Championship ring with the New York Jets in 1968 and had the only sack of the game; as well as a World Championship with the Jets after the 1968 season, when he was team co-captain in the Jets' upset of the heavily favored NFL Champion Baltimore Colts. Rochester is one of only twenty players who played the entire ten years of the AFL's existence.

See also

Other American Football League players

References

1938 births
2020 deaths
Sportspeople from Lansing, Michigan
Players of American football from Michigan
American football defensive tackles
Michigan State Spartans football players
Dallas Texans (AFL) players
Kansas City Chiefs players
New York Jets players
American Football League All-Star players
American Football League players